"Father's Kill" is a 2009 fantasy short story by Christopher Green.

Background
"Father's Kill" was first published on 27 August 2009 in Beneath Ceaseless Skies #24, published by Firkin Press. It was one of two stories featured in the magazine, the other being "Sorrow’s Blade" by Rita Oakes. "Father's Kill" was a joint-winner of the 2009 Aurealis Award for best fantasy short story, winning alongside Ian McHugh's "Once a Month, On a Sunday".

Synopsis

References

External links
Father's Kill at Beneath Ceaseless Skies #24

2009 short stories
Australian short stories
Fantasy short stories
Works originally published in American magazines
Works originally published in fantasy fiction magazines
Works originally published in online magazines
Aurealis Award-winning works